Sportivo Iteño is a Paraguayan football club based in the city of Itá, in Asunción. The club was founded on June 1, 1924 and plays in the Paraguayan División Intermedia, the second division of the Paraguayan league. Their home games are played at Salvador Morga stadium which has a capacity of about 4,500 people.

Current squad
As of March 2021.

Honours
 Paraguayan Third Division: 1985

References

External links
Sportivo Iteño Info

Iteno
Iteno
Association football clubs established in 1924
1924 establishments in Paraguay